Claude-François Achard (1751–1809) was a French physician and author. He was the founder of the first public library in Marseille. He was the author of several books, including the first French-Provençal dictionary.

Early life
Claude-François Achard was born on 23 May 1751 in Marseille, France. He was raised as a Roman Catholic. He was educated in Montpellier, and he earned a doctorate in medicine from the University of Avignon in 1772.

Career
Achard started his career as a physician in Aubagne from 1772 to 1775. He subsequently practised medicine in Marseille, and he became a member of the Société Royale de médecine de Paris in 1785.

Achard was also the author of several non-fiction books. For example, he wrote the first French-Provençal dictionary. He became a member of the Académie de Marseille in 1786.

Achard began collecting books from Catholic schools and monasteries closed down during the French Revolution in 1790. By 1793, he was a founder of the first public library in Marseille, based in the Couvent des Bernardines.

Achard was a Freemason. He spearheaded the growth of Freemasonry in Marseille during the French Consulate, and he reopened a lodge known as "La Triple union".

Death and legacy
Achard died on 29 September 1809 in Marseille. The Rue Achard in the 4th arrondissement of Marseille was named in his honor.

Works

References

1751 births
1809 deaths
Writers from Marseille
18th-century French physicians
French medical writers
French non-fiction writers
French Freemasons
Physicians from Marseille